The National Arts Council of South Africa (NAC) is the official arts council for the Republic of South Africa. The NAC was set in 1997 by an act of the South African Parliament(Act No 56 of 1977).

The NAC is one of the main funding body for South African artists.

References

External links
 National Arts Council of South Africa website

Arts councils
Arts organisations based in South Africa
Cultural organisations based in South Africa